La Vernia High School is a public high school located in La Vernia, Texas (USA). It is part of the La Vernia Independent School District located in northern Wilson County and classified as a 4A school by the UIL.  In 2015, the school was rated "Met Standard" by the Texas Education Agency.

In 2017 the school was affected by a scandal on the varsity football team where younger students were raped during hazing rituals.

Athletics

Sports
The La Vernia Bears compete in these sports 
 Volleyball
 Cross Country
 Football
 Basketball
 Powerlifting
 Soccer
 Golf
 Tennis
 Track
 Baseball 
 Softball

State Titles
Cross Country -
3rd Place, 2016(4A)

Scandal
In March 2017, an investigation into the La Vernia Football program was opened as a result of reports of sexual assault within the football program. Thirteen high school student athletes were arrested in connection to the sexual assault case.

.

Fine Arts
La Vernia High School currently fields a Marching Band, three concert bands, a choir, and a One Act Play Troupe.

Concert Band
La Vernia High School has two concert bands which includes:
the Wind Ensemble
the Symphonic Band

Marching Band
The La Vernia Mighty Bear Band participated in the 2011 3A UIL State Marching Championships and placed 16th.
The La Vernia Mighty Bear Band is also known to be "The Best Band In The Land".

State Titles
One Act Play - 
1984(2A)

References

External links
 
 La Vernia ISD

Schools in Wilson County, Texas
Public high schools in Texas